The Hon. Captain  Eliot Constantine Yorke DL MP (13 July 1843 – 21 December 1878), was a British politician and courtier.

Background
Yorke was the fourth son of Admiral Charles Philip Yorke, 4th Earl of Hardwicke, and the Hon. Susan, daughter of Thomas Liddell, 1st Baron Ravensworth.

Political career
The Conservative Party adopted Yorke as their candidate at a meeting in Cambridge in October 1873.
Yorke was returned to Parliament as one of three representatives for Cambridgeshire in 1874 (succeeding his elder brother Lord Royston), a seat he held until his early death four years later. He was also a Captain in the Cambridgeshire Militia, an Equerry to His Royal Highness the Duke of Edinburgh and a Deputy Lieutenant of Cambridgeshire.

Family
On 11 February 1873, Yorke married Annie, daughter of Sir Anthony de Rothschild, 1st Baronet, and the marriage was solemnised the next day at St. Andrew's Parish Church, Wimpole, Cambridgeshire.  They had no children. On 21 December 1878, he died at 17 Curzon Street, Mayfair, London, aged 35. He was buried at St Andrew the Apostle, Hamble-le-Rice,
His wife survived him by almost 50 years and died on 21 November 1926, at "Hamble Clife," Southampton, Hampshire.

References

External links 

Darryl Lundy's thePeerage.com page

1843 births
1878 deaths
Younger sons of earls
Conservative Party (UK) MPs for English constituencies
UK MPs 1874–1880
Elliot